Lemo Felise Kepi Faiva'ai (born 19 April 1970 in Wellington) is a New Zealand-born Samoan former rugby union player. He played as a prop.

Career
His first international cap was against Tonga, at Sydney, on 18 September 1998. He was part of the 1999 Rugby World Cup squad, although he didn't play in any match. His last international cap was against Fiji, at Lautoka, on 3 July 1999.

External links

Kepi F. Faiva'ai at New Zealand Rugby History

1970 births
Living people
Rugby union players from Wellington City
Samoan rugby union players
Samoan people of New Zealand descent
New Zealand sportspeople of Samoan descent
Rugby union props
Samoa international rugby union players